The minister of tourism is a minister of the Crown member of the Canadian Cabinet. The office is associated with Innovation, Science and Economic Development Canada.

Randy Boissonnault is the first and current minister of tourism. He was appointed on October 26, 2021 and concurrently serves as the associate minister of finance.

List of ministers

References 

Tourism